The "Studium", or in full the Accademia di Casale e del Monferrato per l'Arte, la Letteratura, la Storia, le Scienze e le Varie Umanità (Academy of Casale Monferrato for Art, Literature, History, Science and Various Humanity Studies), was significant in the Middle Ages as a major center in Casale Monferrato for academic and scholarly achievement. It possessed several scientific sections devoted to science, history, literature, music and art. The Academy was founded in 1476 by Guglielmo VIII Paleologo, Marquis of Monteferrat. Over time, the society witnessed a slow and inexorable decline. However, in 1978, the academy was revitalized by a group of scholars, scientists and academicians who  wished to  advance its cause in international culture. Alfredo degli Uberti  (1923-2007)  served as the academy's pro-rector from 1980 till 2002. degli Uberti, a knight of several noted chivalric orders (Equestrian Order of the Saint Gregory the Great, The Sacred Military Constantinian Order of Saint George and honorary member of the Accademia di Marina di Santo Stefano di Pisa) also served as vice-president of Kiwanis Club of Casale Monferrato (1978-1979).  From 1981 to his death in  2015, the President of the Senato Accademico has been Infante Carlos, Duke of Calabria, Head of the House of Bourbon-Two Sicilies. From November 2015 Presidency has been taken over by H.R.H. Maria Teresa di Borbone Parma (1933-2020). From 2012 the pro-rector is Maria Loredana Pinotti.

Today, the academy conducts numerous conferences as well as producing several scientific publications. In April of each year, the Academy holds an international meeting of leading Italian and corresponding scholars.

Membership

Election to the Academy is by nomination of three academicians and majority ballot. The Studium has less than 40 academicians of which several are Nobel Prize laureates.

Notable members

Arts

Pietro Annigoni     
Venanzo Crocetti 
Luciano Minguzzi
  Marco Horak

Diplomats

Andrea Cordero Lanza di Montezemolo
Prince Nikolaus of Liechtenstein
Laurent Stefanini
Marcia Covarrubias Martínez

History

Vicente de Cadenas y Vicent  
Jacques Le Goff
Eric Mension-Rigau

Music

Massimo Mila       
Carolina Murat

Science

 Rita Levi Montalcini   
 Salvador E. Luria
 Guido Peter Broich
 Paolo Adravanti
Literature

 Eugenio Montale 
 Mario Luzi    
 Alessandro Cutolo   
 Ignazio Silone 
 Giuseppe Pittano
 Nantas Salvalaggio
 Mohamed Salmawy

Statesmen

 Riccardo Triglia
 Otto von Habsburg    
 Walburga Douglas    
 Giovanni Goria   
 Giovanni Spadolini   
 Pier Luigi Romita   
 Angelino Alfano 
 Gianfranco Micciché  
 Guido de Marco  
 Sandro Pertini
 Rodi Kratsa-Tsagaropoulou
 Prince Leka of Albania
 Apostolos Kratsas

Various Humanities

 Valentina Cortese
 Peter Kolosimo
 Owana Salazar
 Ilias Lalaounis
 Fabrizio Menchini Fabris
 Sami Aldeeb
 Emma Viora di Bastide Zavattaro Ardizzi
 Giovanni Tonucci

Public Entities

 International Committee of the Red Cross
 Royal College of Spain in Bologna
 Istituto Superiore Statale "Leardi" in Casale Monferrato
 Real Hermandad de Nobles Espanoles de Santiago en Naples
 Corpo militare della Croce Rossa Italiana
 Corpo delle infermiere volontarie della Croce Rossa Italiana
 Real Asociación de Hidalgos de España

References

"La Presentazione dello Studium di Maria Loredana Pinotti," Valori Tattili, Fondazione Asset Banca San Marino perl' Arte (V. Edizione del Premio Internationale,  Dr. Otto d’Asburgo, Oct. 2012), 16-17.

Pinotti, Maria Loredana, "La V edizione del Premio Internationale Dr. Otto d' Asburgo," Il Mondo del Cavaliere, Rivista Internationale Sugi Ordini Cavallereschi, XII:48 (October–December 2012)

Learned societies of Italy
Scientific organisations based in Italy